Interstate 70 (I-70) in the US state of Pennsylvania runs east–west across the southwest part of the state serving the southern fringe of the Pittsburgh metropolitan area. About half of the route is concurrent with I-76 on the Pennsylvania Turnpike, which is a toll road. This is the oldest segment of I-70 in Pennsylvania, having been completed in 1940, and is only one of two segments of I-70 that are tolled, with the other being the Kansas Turnpike. I-70 is one of only a few Interstate Highways to have a traffic signal—in this case, with U.S. Route 30 (US 30) in Breezewood, where it leaves the Pennsylvania Turnpike and heads toward Maryland.

Route description
Two segments of I-70 in Pennsylvania are not designed to modern Interstate standards: a  segment from Washington to New Stanton and the aforementioned half-mile signalized segment in Breezewood.

West Virginia to Washington
I-70 enters Pennsylvania from West Virginia, coming into Donegal Township, Washington County. The highway continues northeast as a four-lane freeway with a standard-size median up to Interstate Highway standards through rural areas of woodland and farmland, coming to its first junction at a partial cloverleaf interchange with State Route 3023 (SR 3023), to the southeast of unincorporated village of West Alexander. Past this junction, the freeway begins to parallel US 40 on the northwest side of the road, before it enters a series of winding curves. From here, I-70 heads east to meet a weigh station and a welcome center in the eastbound direction, as well as an interchange with SR 3024 connecting to Pennsylvania Route 231 (PA 231) via US 40 in the borough of Claysville.

The freeway curves to a more east-northeasterly direction, where it briefly passes through the borough limits of Claysville, before briefly reentering Donegal Township. I-70 enters Buffalo Township, where it soon meets a pair of right-in/right-out ramps connecting to PA 221, that serves the unincorporated village of Taylorstown to the northeast, in adjacent Blaine Township. The freeway comes into North Franklin Township before crossing into Canton Township at its partial interchange with US 40 which lacks a westbound entrance; the interchange is adjacent to the Washington Crown Center shopping mall located to the southwest of the interchange. From here, I-70 crosses over an abandoned portion of the Allegheny Valley Railroad's W&P Subdivision line and enters mixed areas of development on the outskirts of the city of Washington, which is also the county seat of Washington County. After passing through an interchange with Sheffield Avenue serving the industrial and commercial area of Jessop Place, the freeway enters the city limits of Washington, where it comes to a pair of right-in/right-out ramps that connect to PA 18. A short distance later, I-70 enters South Strabane Township and reaches its western junction with I-79 at a directional interchange, which heads north toward the city of Pittsburgh. 

The freeway turns southeast through the interchange and begins a concurrency with I-79. A Jersey barrier takes over in the highway's median as it comes to a diverging diamond interchange with US 19 in a commercial area surrounded by strip malls. A short distance later, I-70/I-79 comes to a partial cloverleaf interchange with PA 136 to the northeast of the borough limits of East Washington that provides access to Washington & Jefferson College; a park and ride lot is located in the northeastern corner of the interchange. Past PA 136, the freeway heads back into rural areas with scattered residences, before reaching the eastern split between I-70 and I-79 at a directional interchange. I-79 turns south toward the city of Morgantown, West Virginia, while I-70 continues east along the original roadway toward the borough of New Stanton in Westmoreland County.

Washington to New Stanton

East of I-79, I-70 downgrades to an expressway substandard of modern Interstate standards. This section of I-70 (old I-70S) has several dated design features. The median narrows to the point that there are no shoulders between the median barrier and the passing lanes on both sides. On- and off-ramps at many of the interchanges are substandard in both length and geometry, which requires vehicles to decelerate in the travel lanes before entering the off-ramps, and also necessitates the use of stop signs on the on-ramps instead of yield signs. Several overpasses do not meet minimum clearance requirements, which has resulted in damage to and from overheight trucks. Total reconstruction efforts are ongoing that will upgrade most of this segment of I-70 and its interchanges to modern Interstate standards, and various projects are scheduled through the early 2020s.

The first interchange that the freeway meets past I-79 is with PA 519, where the route crosses into Somerset Township. I-70 continues through areas of rural farmland with surroundings of wooded rolling hills and turns to the east-southeast, coming to interchanges with SR 1055 south of the hamlet of Dunningsville and McIllvaine Road southeast of the hamlet of Kammerer, in adjacent Nottingham Township, before reaching the borough limits of Bentleyville at the PA 917 interchange, which only contains an eastbound exit and westbound entrance. Shortly afterward, the expressway crosses over Norfolk Southern Railway's Ellsworth Secondary and meets modified right-in/right-out ramps to Wilson Road, which provides complete access to PA 917 and the center of Bentleyville to and from both directions. Following Bentleyville, I-70 enters Fallowfield Township, where it has a complete diamond interchange with PA 481, a westbound exit and eastbound entrance to Twin Bridges Road to the northeast of the hamlet of Lover, and a full cloverleaf interchange with the Mon–Fayette Expressway (PA 43), as the route descends into the valley of the Monongahela River. From here, the expressway curves east-northeast into the borough of Twilight, before crossing into the borough of Speers at the interchange with Maple Drive/Twilight Hollow Road. At this point, I-70 meets PA 88 at a pair of right-in/right-out ramps, prior to crossing over Norfolk Southern Railway's Mon Line, the Monongahela River, and CSX Transportation's Mon Subdivision on the Belle Vernon Bridge, where the route leaves both Speers and Washington County. 

Beyond the Belle Vernon Bridge, the route enters Westmoreland County within Rostraver Township. Here, it has a partial cloverleaf interchange with PA 906, before it crosses into the borough of North Belle Vernon and interchanges with Fayette Street, to the northeast of the borough center. From this point, the expressway heads back into Rostraver Township where it meets PA 201 at a partial cloverleaf interchange northeast of the community of Lynnwood-Pricedale that also provides access to PA 837. I-70 continues through wooded areas with nearby development, reaching an interchange with SR 3011 north of the hamlet of Arnold City in adjacent Washington Township, Fayette County, before coming to a cloverleaf interchange with PA 51 as the route begins to enter the valley of the Youghiogheny River. Past PA 51, the route crosses the Smithton High-Level Bridge over the Youghiogheny River and CSX Transportation's Keystone Subdivision, where it enters South Huntingdon Township. From here, I-70 interchanges with SR 3031 north of the borough of Smithton, PA 31 at cloverleaf to the northwest of the Pittsburgh Renaissance Festival grounds, and SR 3010 to the southeast of the unincorporated village of Yukon, before it comes into Sewickley Township. In this area, the expressway has an interchange with Waltz Mill Road to the south of the borough of Madison, before it passes through Hempfield Township prior to entering New Stanton. Within the borough limits, I-70 has a dumbbell interchange with SR 3089, before it exits the mainline expressway at a trumpet interchange, to come to a toll plaza for the New Stanton interchange on the Pennsylvania Turnpike (I-76). At this point, the mainline expressway continues east to a cloverleaf junction between US 119 and the southern terminus of PA 66. I-70 itself passes through the toll plaza and comes to another trumpet interchange, where the Interstate merges onto the eastbound turnpike that heads toward the city of Harrisburg, the state capital of Pennsylvania. In the opposite direction, the Pennsylvania Turnpike heads northwest toward Pittsburgh, then becomes the Ohio Turnpike, which continues towards Cleveland.

Pennsylvania Turnpike concurrency

For  from New Stanton to Breezewood, I-70 shares a concurrency with I-76 along the Pennsylvania Turnpike. I-70 passes through a wind farm in Somerset County and close to the 9/11 Flight 93 National Memorial in Shanksville. It then has an indirect connection to I-99 in Bedford County before reaching the eastern end of its concurrency with the Turnpike in Breezewood.

Breezewood to Maryland

I-70 splits from the Pennsylvania Turnpike at the Breezewood Interchange in East Providence Township, Bedford County. The turnpike continues east toward Harrisburg and Philadelphia, while I-70 passes through another toll plaza and passes under its own carriageways, before downgrading into another highway substandard of Interstate standards, at a partial trumpet interchange with US 30. Eastbound I-70 merges onto westbound US 30 to form a half-mile wrong-way concurrency through the community of Breezewood. This section of I-70 is one of the few instances of where an Interstate Highway follows a road that lacks grade separation and includes traffic signals. I-70 follows US 30 west along a five-lane highway with a center turn lane through commercial areas in Breezewood before it splits from US 30 and turns left onto another freeway alignment. US 30, meanwhile, continues west toward the borough of Everett.

Beyond US 30, I-70 heads south and becomes a four-lane limited-access freeway that once again conforms to modern Interstate standards. The median widens, before the freeway crosses over its preceding carriageways and under the Pennsylvania Turnpike. Shortly past the turnpike underpass, there is an interchange with South Breezewood Road before I-70 curves to cross Rays Hill, crossing into Fulton County, and coming to a pair of right-in/right-out ramps with the southern terminus of PA 915 in the unincorporated village of Crystal Spring, in Brush Creek Township. The freeway continues through a valley of farmland and comes to an eastbound rest area on the western slope of Town Hill, which the highway crosses at an oblique angle. In the middle of the mountain crossing, I-70 has another pair of right-in/right-out ramps with the northern terminus of PA 643, and then descends along the length of its eastern slope into another rural valley. Within this valley, the freeway enters Union Township, turns generally more southeast and interchanges with the northern terminus of PA 731, east of the unincorporated village of Amaranth.

Past PA 731, I-70 crosses Sideling Hill and comes into Bethel Township. The route heads through forested and mountainous surroundings in the watershed of Tonoloway Creek, before coming to an interchange with the western end of the highway's concurrency with US 522 in the unincorporated town of Warfordsburg. Southbound US 522 merges onto eastbound I-70 and the two routes run concurrent across the Mason–Dixon line into Washington County, Maryland.

History

By 1947, present I-70 across Pennsylvania was included in the planned Interstate Highway System. The route from West Virginia split at Washington, with one branch heading northeast to meet the Pennsylvania Turnpike near Pittsburgh and the other heading east, bypassing Pittsburgh to the south (via a planned bypass of PA 71) to the New Stanton interchange. The piece south from the Breezewood interchange into Maryland was also in the network. The route between US 30 in Breezewood and US 522 in Warfordsburg was originally known as Pennsylvania Route 126 (PA 126). In 1957, preliminary numbers were assigned; the longer route via Pittsburgh (now I-79 and I-376) became the main line of I-70, while the southern bypass (now I-70) became Interstate 70S (I-70S). The section of present-day I-70 between PA 519 near Washington and New Stanton was built as a four-lane divided highway known as the "Express Highway"; this road was assigned the temporary PA 71 Alternate (PA 71 Alt.) designation in 1957 and would be designated as I-70S following the completion of additional connecting roads in the Interstate Highway System. On July 15, 1960, I-70 was designated onto the Penn-Lincoln Parkway. A southern extension of I-79 (which had previously only run from Erie south to Pittsburgh) to Charleston, West Virginia, in 1963 resulted in changes to I-70. On February 26, 1964, as part of the formation of I-76 (east of Downtown Pittsburgh), the American Association of State Highway and Transportation Officials (AASHTO) approved a rerouting of I-70 along I-70S. The former I-70 became I-79 from Washington to downtown Pittsburgh and I-76 to and along the Turnpike to New Stanton. This brought the routing of I-70 to its present form.

Future
In 2011, the Pennsylvania Department of Transportation (PennDOT) began preliminary work for a total reconstruction of I-70 between the West Virginia state line and New Stanton. Approximately $500 million will be spent on this  segment of highway in order to improve it to modern Interstate standards, half of which will be spent redesigning eight interchanges. Other planned improvements include six overpass replacements, a new roadbed, a wider median, electronic ITS signage, and widening the I-70/I-79 concurrency in Washington to six lanes.

Two noteworthy interchange projects will occur in conjunction with the I-70/I-79 widening. Underway is a reconfiguration of the east/south split between I-70 and I-79, which will eliminate the one-lane, low-speed loop ramp from I-79 northbound to I-70 westbound, replacing it with a two-lane, high-speed flyover ramp. Preliminary design work has also been completed for a redesigned interchange between I-70/I-79 and Murtland Avenue (US 19), and involves replacing the existing substandard cloverleaf in favor of the first diverging diamond interchange in Pennsylvania.

Exit list

See also

References

External links

 Pennsylvania Highways: Interstate 70
 I-70 at AARoads.com
 Pennsylvania Roads - I-70

 Pennsylvania
70
Transportation in Washington County, Pennsylvania
Transportation in Westmoreland County, Pennsylvania
Transportation in Somerset County, Pennsylvania
Transportation in Bedford County, Pennsylvania
Transportation in Fulton County, Pennsylvania
Toll roads in Pennsylvania